Ralph Miller (born August 13, 1948) is an American football player. Besides being a founding member of the National Football League Players Association, Miller has played for NFL teams New Orleans Saints, the Houston Oilers, the Philadelphia Eagles, the San Diego Chargers, the New York Giants, and the San Francisco 49ers. He later served as President of the Los Angeles County Deputy Probation Officers Union since 1997. Prior to his professional football career, he was a collegiate football player for the Kingsmen team at California Lutheran University in Thousand Oaks, California. Miller migrated to California after having attended Alabama State University and became a notable player in the 1971 NAIA Division II Football National Championship. He was active in the civil rights movement in Alabama and became a mortgage banker and a Los Angeles County probation officer. He chaired the Black Student Union and the Third World Alliance at California Lutheran University, and later joined the Houston Oilers as a free agent and played five years in the National, Canadian and World Football Leagues.

References

1948 births
People from Hartford, Alabama
New Orleans Saints players
Living people
Cal Lutheran Kingsmen football players